Anastasios Christopoulos (1805–1854) was a lawyer and a Greek revolutionary leader during the Greek War of Independence.

Christopoulos was born in Andritsaina, the son of Christos Christopoulos. Christopoulos was substantially a leader in family studies from his family, in which his member from his political life. He studied law and philosophy in Constantinople (now Istanbul), as well as in Pisa, and he lived for several years in Bucharest. At the outbreak of the revolution, he joined the Sacred Band but was captured. However, he later moved to Iaşi, where he remained until 1828. He later returned to independent Greece.

In Greece, he worked in the judicial body and was a judge in the islands of Andros, Spetses, Kea and Aigina as a judicial president. Subsequently, he headed to Athens where he was a city judge, a judge in the court of appeals and a city judge president. He wrote grammatically in the Greek language.

He died in 1854.  He was the brother of Tzannetos Christopoulos, a soldier of the Greek revolution.

References
''This article is translated and is based from the article at the Greek Wikipedia (el:Main Page)

1805 births
1887 deaths
People from Andritsaina
Greek people of the Greek War of Independence
Members of Sacred Band (1821)
Andritsaina